John Colville may refer to:

Sir John Colville (died 1394) (1337–1394), MP for Cambridgeshire
John Colville, 9th Lord Colville of Culross (1768–1849), Royal Navy officer
John Colville (c. 1540–1605), Commissioner to the Scots Parliament for Stirling, clergyman, judge, spy, outlaw and writer
John Colville (Liberal politician) (1852–1901), father of Lord Clydesmuir, MP for North East Lanarkshire
John Colville, 1st Baron Clydesmuir (1894–1954), Scottish Conservative politician, Governor of Bombay 1943–1948
Jock Colville (1915–1987), English civil servant and diarist

See also
Sir John Coleville, a character in Shakespeare's play Henry IV, Part 2
Colville (surname)